Idia occidentalis is a species of litter moth of the family Erebidae first described by Smith in 1884. It is found in North America from southern Alberta and British Columbia, south to Colorado, Arizona and California.

It was formerly considered a subspecies of Idia lubricalis.

The wingspan is about 30 mm. Adults are on wing in August in the north.

The insect has a yellow-brown colour, and a "cloudy" pattern. It is said the insect's flight history is from May to October, and that it seems to occupy: dry open areas, arid native grasslands, and badlands.

References

External links

Herminiinae
Moths of North America
Moths described in 1884